The 2001 German Figure Skating Championships took place on January 4–7, 2001 in Oberstdorf. Skaters competed in the disciplines of men's singles, ladies' singles, pair skating, ice dancing, and synchronized skating.

Guest skaters from France competed in the pairs, ice dancing, and synchronized events.

Results

Men

Ladies

Pairs

Ice dancing

Synchronized

External links
 2001 German Championships results

German Figure Skating Championships, 2001
German Figure Skating Championships